Matthew Bishop is the name of:
Matthew Bishop (footballer) (born 1975), former Australian rules footballer
Matthew Bishop (journalist), economics journalist and writer

See also